Janssen Park is a municipal park in the heart of the city of Mena, Arkansas.  It is bounded by Janssen and Port Arthur Avenues, and 9th and 7th Streets.  The park is a large grassy expanse with occasional mature trees, and features walkways radiating from a central drive, which circles around Mena's oldest building, the c. 1850s Shelton log cabin.  A pair of ponds are located in the park's southern quadrant, and there is a clocktower within the circle near the cabin.  The park was laid out in 1896, the year of the city's founding, but was not properly developed until ten years later.  The park was listed on the National Register of Historic Places in 1979.

Gallery

See also
National Register of Historic Places listings in Polk County, Arkansas

References

Parks in Arkansas
Buildings and structures completed in 1851
Buildings and structures in Polk County, Arkansas
Historic districts on the National Register of Historic Places in Arkansas
1851 establishments in Arkansas
National Register of Historic Places in Polk County, Arkansas
Parks on the National Register of Historic Places in Arkansas